Cumbres Borrascosas (English: Wuthering Heights) is a Venezuelan telenovela written and adapted by Delia Fiallo for Venevisión in 1976, based on the 1847 novel Wuthering Heights by Emily Brontë.

The series stars José Bardina, Elluz Peraza, Eduardo Serrano and Mary Soliani.

Cast 
José Bardina as Heathcliff
Elluz Peraza as Catalina
América Alonso as María
Martín Lantigua as Enrique
Eduardo Serrano as Edgardo
Mary Soliani as Isabel
Caridad Canelón as Cathy
Raúl Xiquez as José
Eva Blanco as Nelly
Humberto García as Lockwood
Ivonne Attas
Henry Galué as Hareton

See also 
List of telenovelas of Venevisión

References

External links 

1976 telenovelas
Venevisión telenovelas
1976 Venezuelan television series debuts
1976 Venezuelan television series endings
Spanish-language telenovelas
Venezuelan telenovelas
Films based on Wuthering Heights
Television shows set in Venezuela